Nationality words link to articles with information on the nation's poetry or literature (for instance, Irish or France).

Events

951:
 Compilation of the Gosen Wakashū, a Japanese imperial poetry anthology

Works published

Births
Death years link to the corresponding "[year] in poetry" article. There are conflicting or unreliable sources for the birth years of many people born in this period; where sources conflict, the poet is listed again and the conflict is noted:

954:
 Wang Yucheng (died 1001), Song

956:
 Akazome Emon 赤染衛門 (died 1041), Japanese waka poet who lived in the mid-Heian period; a member of both the Thirty-six Elder Poetic Sages and  Fujiwara no Kintō's 36 female poetry immortals (or "sages") of the Kamakura period (surname: Akazome)

Deaths
Birth years link to the corresponding "[year] in poetry" article:

958:
 Ōnakatomi no Yorimoto (born 886), one of the Thirty-six Poetry Immortals of Japan

See also

 Poetry
 10th century in poetry
 10th century in literature
 List of years in poetry

Other events:
 Other events of the 12th century
 Other events of the 13th century

10th century:
 10th century in poetry
 10th century in literature

Notes

10th-century poetry
Poetry